Ozone Park station may refer to:
 Ozone Park station (LIRR)
 Ozone Park–Lefferts Boulevard (IND Fulton Street Line)